Diarmuid Duggan (born 1980) is an Irish former Gaelic football player and manager who played for club side Ilen Rovers, at divisional level with Carbery and at inter-county level with the Cork senior football team. He usually lined out at right corner-back.

Career
Duggan first came to Gaelic football prominence with the Ilen Rovers club in West Cork, with whom he won an All-Ireland Club Championship medal in the intermediate grade in 2004. He had earlier won county junior and intermediate medals. Duggan first played for Cork at minor and under-21 levels, while he won an All-Ireland Junior Championship title in 2001. He subsequently progressed onto the Cork senior team and won two Munster Championship medals and was a substitute when Cork were beaten by Kerry in the 2007 All-Ireland final. As a player with Munster, Duggan won a Railway Cup medal in 2008. A series of injuries brought an end to his playing career, and he turned to coaching and team management with his home club.

Honours
Ilen Rovers
All-Ireland Intermediate Club Football Championship: 2004
Munster Intermediate Club Football Championship: 2003
Cork Intermediate Football Championship: 2003
Cork Junior A Football Championship: 2001
South West Junior A Football Championship: 1999, 2000, 2001

Cork
Munster Senior Football Championship: 2006, 2008
All-Ireland Junior Football Championship: 2001
Munster Junior Football Championship: 2001
Munster Under-21 Football Championship: 2001

Munster
Railway Cup: 2008

References

1980 births
Living people
Ilen Rovers Gaelic footballers
Carbery Gaelic footballers
Cork inter-county Gaelic footballers
Munster inter-provincial Gaelic footballers
Gaelic football managers
Gaelic football selectors
Heads of schools in Ireland